New Blood is a British television drama series created by Anthony Horowitz and produced by Eleventh Hour Films for BBC One. The first three episodes of the programme were made available on BBC iPlayer on 2 June 2016, ahead of the BBC One premiere on 9 June. It received over 4 million viewers.

Synopsis 
Stefan Kowolski and Arrash Sayyad are junior investigators; both are the children of immigrants. Initially thrown together by chance and common sporting interests, they later discover that they are working two different angles of the same case.  Stefan is also attracted to Arrash's sister.

Kowolski is a junior investigator with the Serious Fraud Office, while Sayyad is a uniformed constable in London's police service, with ambitions of becoming a detective. In the first case, he secures a second posting as a Trainee Detective Constable (T/DC), having obtained poor reviews in an earlier attempt.

Cast
The main cast for the first series include:
 Mark Strepan as Stefan Kowolski, Junior Case Officer, SFO
 Ben Tavassoli as T.D.C Arrash 'Rash' Sayyad
 Mark Addy as D.S. Derek Sands
 Dorian Lough as D.I. Martin Heywood
 Anna Chancellor as Eleanor Davies, Director of the SFO
 Ariyon Bakare as Marcus Johnson, Senior Case Officer, SFO
 Kimberley Nixon as Alison White, Junior Case Officer, SFO
 Aiysha Hart as Leila Sayyad, Junior Nurse, Arrash's sister
 Mark Bonnar as Peter Mayhew, Government Health Advisor

Episodes

References

External links 
 

2016 British television series debuts
2016 British television series endings
2010s British drama television series
BBC high definition shows
BBC television dramas
British crime drama television series
2010s British mystery television series
English-language television shows
Television shows written by Anthony Horowitz
Television shows set in London